Eupoecilia diana is a species of moth of the family Tortricidae. It is found on the Solomon Islands east of New Guinea.

References

Moths described in 1968
Eupoecilia